Kasimabad is a town and a tehsil in Ghazipur District of Uttar Pradesh, India. Qasimabad also served as the capital of Qasimabad Estate.

See also
 Qasimabad Fort, Ghazipur

References

Cities and towns in Ghazipur district